Neve Shalom Synagogue (lit. "Oasis of Peace" or "Valley of Peace") is a synagogue in the Karaköy quarter of Beyoğlu district, in Istanbul, Turkey.

The synagogue was built in response to an increase in the Jewish population in the old Galata neighborhood (today encompassed by Beyoğlu district) in the late 1930s. A Jewish primary school was torn down in 1949 for that purpose and the synagogue was built on its ruins. The construction completed in 1951. Its architects were Elyo Ventura and Bernar Motola, young Turkish Jews. The inauguration of the synagogue was held on Sunday, March 25, 1951 (17 Adar 5711, Hebrew calendar), in the presence of the Chief Rabbi of Turkey of the time, Hahambaşı Rav. Rafael David Saban.

Neve Shalom is the central and largest Sephardic synagogue in Istanbul, open to service especially on Shabbats, High Holidays, bar mitzvahs, funerals and weddings.

Neve Shalom suffered three terrorist attacks:
On September 6, 1986, gunmen opened fire during a Shabbat service, which resulted in the death of 22 people. The attack was attributed to the Palestinian militant Abu Nidal.
On March 1, 1992, a bomb attack was carried out by two men, causing no damage or casualties.
On November 16, 2003, the synagogue was hit by one of four car bomb attacks carried out in Istanbul that week (see 2003 Istanbul bombings). Even though a local Turkish militant group, the Great Eastern Islamic Raiders' Front, claimed responsibility for the attacks, police claimed the bombings were "too sophisticated to have been carried out by that group", with a senior Israeli government source saying: "the attack must have been at least coordinated with international terror organizations".

See also
 History of the Jews in Turkey
 List of synagogues in Turkey

References

External links
 Chief Rabbinate of Turkey
 Neve Shalom Synagogue Official Website
 Shalom Newspaper - The main Jewish newspaper in Turkey

Synagogues in Istanbul
Beyoğlu
Orthodox synagogues
Synagogues completed in 1951
1951 establishments in Turkey
Massacres in religious buildings and structures
Palestinian terrorist incidents in Europe
20th-century attacks on synagogues and Jewish communal organizations
21st-century attacks on synagogues and Jewish communal organizations
Terrorist incidents in Turkey in 2003
Terrorist incidents in Turkey in 1986
Terrorist incidents in Turkey in 1992
Abu Nidal attacks
20th-century religious buildings and structures in Turkey